Yancey Strickler (born November 4, 1978) is an American author, entrepreneur, and former music critic. He co-founded Kickstarter, the funding platform for creative projects and wrote This Could Be Our Future, a 2019 Penguin Random House book about building a society that looks beyond profit as its core organizing principle. The book also describes a decision-making framework that Yancey invented called Bentoism.

Early life and education
Strickler was born in rural Virginia. While attending Giles High School he became interested in journalism and earned an internship with The Roanoke Times New River Current.  He attended College of William & Mary where he majored in English and Literary and Cultural Studies. After graduating from William and Mary, he moved to New York City where he worked as a music journalist for publications including Spin, The Village Voice, and the website eMusic.

References

1978 births
Living people